Epipactis tremolsii is a species of terrestrial orchid in the genus Epipactis. It is confined to the western Mediterranean region where it grows in open mixed oak, cork oak and pine woodland. In Portugal in the Algarve region, it flowers rather earlier than Epipactis helleborine and can be found from April onwards (or earlier in an early spring).

References 

tremolsii
Plants described in 1914
Orchids of Europe